Byungjin is a political term in North Korea. It originally refers to Kim Il-sung's policy in the 1960s to simultaneously develop the military and the economy. Under Kim Jong-un, grandson of Kim Il-sung, it has referred to simultaneous development of nuclear weapons and the economy.

See also 

 Economy of North Korea
 Korean People's Army
 North Korea and weapons of mass destruction
 Juche
 Songun
 Strong and Prosperous Nation

References

Citations

Sources

Further reading

External links 
 A Note on Byungjin by B. R. Myers

Economy of North Korea
Kim Il-sung
Government of North Korea
Militarism
Military history of North Korea
Politics of North Korea
Nuclear program of North Korea